Mchawcha is a traditional Algerian Kabyle 
cake that is often drizzled with honey.

Mchawcha is a sweet thick cake that originates from Algeria. The recipe is simple and it is quick to make, it is often drizzled with honey.

See also
 Algerian cuisine

References

Algerian cuisine